The nine-headed bird (九頭鳥), also called the "Nine Phoenix" (九鳳), is one of the earliest forms of the fenghuang, worshiped by ancient natives in Hubei Province, which during the Warring States period was part of the kingdom of Chu (楚). Due to the hostile relationship between the Kingdom of Chu and its former overlord, the reigning Zhou Dynasty, the nine-headed bird, being the totem creature of the Chu people, was demonised as a result.

See also
Birds in Chinese mythology

References

Mythological and legendary Chinese birds
Mythical many-headed creatures
Yaoguai
Phoenix birds